The M94 is a short metropolitan route in Greater Johannesburg, South Africa.

Route 
The M94 begins at the M48 and ends at the M35.

References 

Streets and roads of Johannesburg
Metropolitan routes in Johannesburg